Jonathan Edward  Williams (born February 25, 1995), also known by his nickname "Jon-Jon", is an American basketball player who last played for GTK Gliwice of the Polish Basketball League. Williams played four seasons of college basketball for Toledo before starting a professional career in Europe.

As a senior at Toledo, Williams averaged 19.6 points per game. He was named to the Third Team All-MAC.

Professional career
In his first professional season, Williams played with GTK Gliwice of the Polish Basketball League.

On August 1, 2018, Williams signed a one-year contract with Crelan Okapi Aalstar of the Belgian Pro Basketball League.

On October 19, 2019, he has signed with Polpharma Starogard Gdański of the Polska Liga Koszykówki (PLK).

Williams began the 2021-22 season with the Sheffield Sharks of the British Basketball League and averaged 16.4 points, 4.0 rebounds, and 2.3 assists per game. On December 27, 2021, he has signed with GTK Gliwice of the Polish Basketball League.

References

External links
Toledo Rockets bio

1995 births
Living people
American expatriate basketball people in Belgium
American expatriate basketball people in Poland
American expatriate basketball people in the United Kingdom
American men's basketball players
Basketball players from Michigan
GTK Gliwice players
Okapi Aalstar players
Point guards
Sportspeople from Southfield, Michigan
Toledo Rockets men's basketball players